Cheswin Williams (born 22 September 1987) is a South African professional rugby union player, currently playing with the . He is a utility back than can play as an outside centre, winger or fullback.

Career

Youth and amateur rugby

Boland Cavaliers

In 2012, Williams was one of the club players that were included in  training squads prior to the 2012 Vodacom Cup competition.

Williams also featured in the ' Currie Cup campaign in the latter half of 2012. Despite a personal points tally of 19 points (one try, four penalties and a conversion), Williams could not prevent the Cavaliers slipping to a 39–34 defeat. He made a total of eight appearances as the Cavaliers finished a disappointing sixth, despite being the defending champions.

Two more appearances followed in the 2013 Vodacom Cup competition and Williams also played ten times during the 2013 Currie Cup First Division competition, scoring three tries.

References

South African rugby union players
Living people
1987 births
People from the West Coast District Municipality
Boland Cavaliers players
Rugby union wings
Rugby union centres
Rugby union fullbacks
Rugby union players from the Western Cape